This article contains records and statistics for the Japanese professional football club, Yokohama F. Marinos.

J.League

Domestic cup competitions

Major International Competitions

Top scorers by season

References

Yokohama F. Marinos
Yokohama F. Marinos